María del Carmen Mendoza Flores (born 1 March 1965) is a Mexican politician affiliated with the National Action Party. As of 2014, she served as Deputy of the LIX Legislature of the Mexican Congress representing Jalisco.

References

1965 births
Living people
People from Querétaro City
Women members of the Chamber of Deputies (Mexico)
National Action Party (Mexico) politicians
Deputies of the LIX Legislature of Mexico
Members of the Chamber of Deputies (Mexico) for Jalisco